Newspoll is an Australian opinion polling brand, published by The Australian and administered by international market research and data analytics group, YouGov.   Newspoll has a long tradition of predicting Australian Federal Election results, both federal and state.

Until May 2015, Newspoll was a market research and polling company, part owned by News Corp Australia. In May 2015 administration of Newspoll was transferred to Galaxy Research. In December 2017, Galaxy Research was acquired by YouGov.

Newspoll's surveys of voting intention are published exclusively in The Australian. 

As founding members of the Australian Polling Council, YouGov adheres to its standards of transparency and ethical behaviour. This includes publishing methodology statements which can be found here 

Newspoll was established in 1985 as a joint venture between News Limited and Yann Campbell Hoare Wheeler, which later was purchased by Millward Brown during the 1990s leading to the current ownership structure.  In 2015 this company was wound up with The Australian announcing that henceforth Newspoll would become a polling brand administered by Galaxy.
The transfer of operation to Galaxy came with a significant change in polling methods, from live telephone interviews to a mix of online and automated telephone interviews. However, the wording of Newspoll questions remained the same. In the first major test of this methodology, Newspoll conducted by Galaxy Research was the most accurate national published poll at the 2016 Australian Federal Election. A further change occurred in November 2019, with YouGov switching to entirely online polling.

Prime Minister polling 

The lists below show the Prime Ministers with the highest and lowest career ratings.  In many cases the highest and second-highest (etc.) or lowest and second-lowest (etc.) ratings are held by the same Prime Minister.

Highest approval rating 
Kevin Rudd has the highest career-peak approval rating, with 71% (18–20 April 2008).
Scott Morrison has the second-highest career-peak approval rating, with 68% (22–25 April 2020 and 24–27 June 2020)
John Howard has the third-highest career-peak approval rating, with 67% (10–12 May 1996) . 
Bob Hawke's highest approval rating was 62% (24–26 Jan 1986), but Newspoll did not poll until over two years after he became Prime Minister.

Highest dissatisfied rating 
Paul Keating has the highest recorded "dissatisfied" rating, with 75% (3–5 September 1993).
Tony Abbott has the second-highest career-peak "dissatisfied" rating, with 68% (6–8 February 2015 and 20–22 February 2015).
Julia Gillard has the equal second-highest career-peak "dissatisfied" rating, with 68% (2–4 September 2011).

Highest "Better Prime Minister" score 
Until mid-1991, "Better Prime Minister" ratings were only surveyed during election campaigns.

Kevin Rudd has the highest "Better Prime Minister" score, with 73% (28 Feb-2 Mar 2008 and 4–6 April 2008).
John Howard has the second-highest career-peak "Better Prime Minister" score, with 67% (20–22 June 2003).
Bob Hawke has the third-highest career-peak "Better Prime Minister" score, with 62% (5–7 June 1987 and 16–21 June 1987).

Lowest "Better Prime Minister" score 
Paul Keating has the lowest "Better Prime Minister" score, with 27% (20–22 August 1993).
Tony Abbott has the second-lowest career-low "Better Prime Minister" score, with 30% (6–8 February 2015).
John Howard has the third-lowest career-low "Better Prime Minister" score, with 31% (24–6 July 1998).

Opposition Leader polling 

Note: The lists below show the Opposition Leaders with the highest and lowest career ratings.  In many cases the highest and second-highest (etc.) or lowest and second-lowest (etc.) ratings are held by the same Opposition Leader.  For instance, 14% is not the second-lowest "Better Prime Minister" score ever recorded, since Brendan Nelson recorded ten scores of below 14%.

Highest approval rating 
Kevin Rudd has had the highest recorded approval rating, of 68% (16–18 February 2007 and 11–13 May 2007).
Mark Latham has the second-highest career-peak approval rating, of 66% (19–21 March 2004).
John Hewson has the third-highest career-peak approval rating, of 55% (17–19 January 1992).

Lowest approval rating 
Alexander Downer recorded the lowest approval rating, of 20% (2–4 December 1994 and 16–18 December 1994).
Three leaders have recorded career-low approval ratings of 22%.  They are Andrew Peacock (19–21 May 1989), John Hewson (11–13 March 1994) and Simon Crean (28–30 November 2003).

Highest dissatisfaction rating 
Alexander Downer recorded the highest dissatisfaction rating, of 69% (2–4 December 1994).
Andrew Peacock recorded the second-highest career-high dissatisfaction rating, of 67% (16–18 March 1990).
John Hewson recorded the third-highest career-high dissatisfaction rating, of 64% (11–13 March 1994).

Highest "Better Prime Minister" score 
Kevin Rudd holds the record with 50% (19–21 October 2007).
Alexander Downer recorded the second-highest career-peak score, of 48% (8–10 July 1994).
Bill Shorten recorded the equal second-highest career-peak score, of 48% (6–8 February 2015).

Lowest "Better Prime Minister" score 
Brendan Nelson holds the record, with 7% (29 February-2 March 2008).
Simon Crean (28–30 November 2003), Malcolm Turnbull (27–29 November 2009) and Bill Shorten (4–6 December 2015) recorded the equal-second lowest career low, with 14%.  See note at top of this section.

See also 

Essential Media Communications
 Opinion polling for the 2022 Australian federal election
 Roy Morgan Research
 YouGov

References

External links 
 Newspoll Market Research homepage 
 Newspoll archive since 1987 
 Galaxy Research polling page including recent Newspoll results

Market research companies of Australia
Companies established in 1985
1985 establishments in Australia
Opinion polling in Australia